Martin Melvin (born 7 August 1969) was a Scottish footballer who played for Stockport County FC, Motherwell FC, Falkirk, Dumbarton and Albion Rovers.

References

1969 births
Scottish footballers
Dumbarton F.C. players
Falkirk F.C. players
Albion Rovers F.C. players
Scottish Football League players
Living people
Association football sweepers